The men's 1500 metres event at the 2010 World Junior Championships in Athletics was held in Moncton, New Brunswick, Canada, at Moncton Stadium on 20 and 22 July.

Medalists

Results

Final
22 July

Heats
20 July

Heat 1

Heat 2

Heat 3

Participation
According to an unofficial count, 42 athletes from 30 countries participated in the event.

References

1500 metres
1500 metres at the World Athletics U20 Championships